Barrio Colón is a corregimiento within the city of La Chorrera, in La Chorrera District, Panamá Oeste Province, Panama with a population of 33,214 as of 2010. Its population as of 1990 was 20,746; its population as of 2000 was 26,818.

References

Corregimientos of Panamá Oeste Province

es:Barrio Colón (Panamá Oeste)